The 2022–23 Phoenix Super LPG Fuel Masters season is the 7th season of the franchise in the Philippine Basketball Association (PBA).

Key dates
May 15: The PBA Season 47 draft was held at the Robinsons Place Manila in Manila.

Draft picks

Roster

Philippine Cup

Eliminations

Standings

Game log

|-bgcolor=ffcccc
| 1
| June 8
| San Miguel
| L 100–108
| Matthew Wright (22)
| Jason Perkins (10)
| Serrano, Wright (5)
| Smart Araneta Coliseum
| 0–1
|-bgcolor=ffcccc
| 2
| June 11
| Meralco
| L 98–109
| Jason Perkins (28)
| Javee Mocon (11)
| Matthew Wright (5)
| Ynares Center
| 0–2
|-bgcolor=ccffcc
| 3
| June 17
| Terrafirma
| W 97–74
| Jason Perkins (17)
| Sean Anthony (12)
| Matthew Wright (10)
| Ynares Center
| 1–2
|-bgcolor=ccffcc
| 4
| June 19
| Rain or Shine
| W 106–102
| RJ Jazul (25)
| Mocon, Perkins (9)
| Matthew Wright (6)
| SM Mall of Asia Arena
| 2–2
|-bgcolor=ffcccc
| 5
| June 24
| Magnolia
| L 77–95
| Javee Mocon (19)
| Jason Perkins (8)
| Matthew Wright (6)
| SM Mall of Asia Arena
| 2–3
|-bgcolor=ffcccc
| 6
| June 26
| TNT
| L 72–87
| Anthony, Tio (13)
| Sean Anthony (14)
| Matthew Wright (4)
| Ynares Center
| 2–4
|-bgcolor=ffcccc
| 7
| June 30
| NLEX
| L 108–114 (OT)
| Matthew Wright (19)
| Larry Muyang (11)
| Matthew Wright (8)
| Smart Araneta Coliseum
| 2–5

|-bgcolor=ffcccc
| 8
| July 8
| Blackwater
| L 89–91
| Jason Perkins (22)
| Jason Perkins (8)
| Matthew Wright (8)
| Smart Araneta Coliseum
| 2–6
|-bgcolor=ffcccc
| 9
| July 14
| NorthPort
| L 92–95
| Matthew Wright (20)
| Javee Mocon (10)
| Jason Perkins (4)
| Smart Araneta Coliseum
| 2–7
|-bgcolor=ccffcc
| 10
| July 16
| Converge
| W 89–66
| Matthew Wright (15)
| Muyang, Wright (8)
| Jason Perkins (5)
| SM Mall of Asia Arena
| 3–7
|-bgcolor=ffcccc
| 11
| July 21
| Barangay Ginebra
| L 93–100
| Jason Perkins (17)
| Anthony, Melecio, Perkins (7)
| Anthony, Tio (4)
| Smart Araneta Coliseum
| 3–8

Commissioner's Cup

Eliminations

Standings

Game log

|-bgcolor=ffcccc
| 1
| September 21, 2022
| NorthPort
| L 89–92
| Javee Mocon (24)
| Kaleb Wesson (15)
| Kaleb Wesson (7)
| SM Mall of Asia Arena
| 0–1
|-bgcolor=ffcccc
| 2
| September 24, 2022
| Blackwater
| L 85–97
| Kaleb Wesson (28)
| Kaleb Wesson (26)
| Tyler Tio (6)
| SM Mall of Asia Arena
| 0–2

|-bgcolor=ffcccc
| 3
| October 1, 2022
| Bay Area
| L 91–101
| Javee Mocon (22)
| Kaleb Wesson (18)
| RJ Jazul (7)
| Smart Araneta Coliseum
| 0–3
|-bgcolor=ccffcc
| 4
| October 8, 2022
| NLEX
| W 111–97
| Tyler Tio (26)
| Kaleb Wesson (21)
| Tio, Wesson (7)
| PhilSports Arena
| 1–3
|-bgcolor=ccffcc
| 5
| October 14, 2022
| Barangay Ginebra
| W 101–93
| Javee Mocon (20)
| Kaleb Wesson (17)
| Tyler Tio (7)
| Smart Araneta Coliseum
| 2–3
|-bgcolor=ccffcc
| 6
| October 19, 2022
| Meralco
| W 89–82
| Kaleb Wesson (23)
| Kaleb Wesson (13)
| Javee Mocon (4)
| PhilSports Arena
| 3–3
|-bgcolor=ccffcc
| 7
| October 26, 2022
| Rain or Shine
| W 92–83
| Kaleb Wesson (21)
| Kaleb Wesson (17)
| Encho Serrano (5)
| Ynares Center
| 4–3
|-bgcolor=ccffcc
| 8
| October 30, 2022
| TNT
| W 91–88
| Kaleb Wesson (23)
| Kaleb Wesson (17)
| RJ Jazul (5)
| Ynares Center
| 5–3

|-bgcolor=ffcccc
| 9
| November 9, 2022
| Converge
| L 127–132
| Kaleb Wesson (25)
| Kaleb Wesson (21)
| Kaleb Wesson (7)
| Smart Araneta Coliseum
| 5–4
|-bgcolor=ffcccc
| 10
| November 12, 2022
| Magnolia
| L 80–90
| Sean Anthony (17)
| Kaleb Wesson (18)
| RJ Jazul (5)
| Ynares Center
| 5–5
|-bgcolor=ffcccc
| 11
| November 19, 2022
| San Miguel
| L 104–108
| Javee Mocon (18)
| Kaleb Wesson (13)
| Kaleb Wesson (7)
| PhilSports Arena
| 5–6
|-bgcolor=ccffcc
| 12
| November 26, 2022
| Terrafirma
| W 135–84
| RR Garcia (20)
| Kaleb Wesson (12) 
| Garcia, Jazul, Wesson (3)
| PhilSports Arena
| 6–6

Playoffs

Bracket

Game log

|-bgcolor=ffcccc
| 1
| December 9, 2022
| Magnolia
| L 95–102
| Tyler Tio (18)
| Kaleb Wesson (12)
| Kaleb Wesson (9)
| PhilSports Arena
| 0–1

Governors' Cup

Eliminations

Standings

Game log

|-bgcolor=ffcccc
| 1
| January 25
| TNT
| L 119–123
| Du'Vaughn Maxwell (21)
| Du'Vaughn Maxwell (19)
| RR Garcia (8)
| Smart Araneta Coliseum
| 0–1
|-bgcolor=ffcccc
| 2
| January 27
| Blackwater
| L 105–108
| Du'Vaughn Maxwell (37)
| Du'Vaughn Maxwell (17)
| Jason Perkins (6)
| Ynares Center
| 0–2
|-bgcolor=ffcccc
| 3
| January 29
| San Miguel
| L 93–114
| Du'Vaughn Maxwell (21)
| Du'Vaughn Maxwell (14)
| Jason Perkins (5)
| Ynares Center
| 0–3

|-bgcolor=ccffcc
| 4
| February 2
| NorthPort
| W 108–97
| Maxwell, Perkins (26)
| Du'Vaughn Maxwell (11)
| Du'Vaughn Maxwell (6)
| PhilSports Arena
| 1–3
|-bgcolor=ffcccc
| 5
| February 4
| NLEX
| L 94–98
| Du'Vaughn Maxwell (25)
| Jason Perkins (13)
| Du'Vaughn Maxwell (7)
| Ynares Center
| 1–4
|-bgcolor=ffcccc
| 6
| February 10
| Magnolia
| L 95–108
| Jason Perkins (20)
| Du'Vaughn Maxwell (10)
| Du'Vaughn Maxwell (5)
| SM Mall of Asia Arena
| 1–5
|-bgcolor=ccffcc
| 7
| February 18
| Terrafirma
| W 125–100
| Du'Vaughn Maxwell (20)
| Du'Vaughn Maxwell (12)
| Du'Vaughn Maxwell (6) 
| Smart Araneta Coliseum
| 2–5
|-bgcolor=ccffcc
| 8
| February 26
| Converge
| W 106–103
| Encho Serrano (28)
| Du'Vaughn Maxwell (15)
| Garcia, Jazul, Maxwell, Mocon, Perkins (3)
| Smart Araneta Coliseum
| 3–5

|-bgcolor=ccffcc
| 9
| March 1
| Rain or Shine
| W 114–106
| Garcia, Serrano (17)
| Du'Vaughn Maxwell (13)
| Lalata, Maxwell, Tio (4)
| Smart Araneta Coliseum
| 4–5
|-bgcolor=ffcccc
| 10
| March 3
| Barangay Ginebra
| L 89–109
| Du'Vaughn Maxwell (22)
| Du'Vaughn Maxwell (7)
| Javee Mocon (6)
| Smart Araneta Coliseum
| 4–6
|-bgcolor=ffcccc
| 11
| March 5
| Meralco
| L 86–92 
| Du'Vaughn Maxwell (29)
| Maxwell, Serrano (9)
| Du'Vaughn Maxwell (3)
| PhilSports Arena
| 4–7

Transactions

Free agency

Signings

Subtraction

Trades

Philippine Cup

Mid-season

Recruited imports

References

Phoenix Super LPG Fuel Masters seasons
Phoenix Super LPG Fuel Masters